Jonáš Forejtek (born 10 March 2001) is a professional tennis player from the Czech Republic. Forejtek has a career high ATP singles ranking of World No. 217, achieved on 1 August 2022. He also has a career high ATP doubles ranking of World No. 302, achieved on 28 February 2022. Forejtek has reached five career singles finals, with a record of 2 wins and 3 losses all on the ITF Futures Tour. Additionally, he has reached five career doubles finals, with a record of 4 wins and 1 loss which includes a 2–0 record in ATP Challenger Tour finals.

Junior career

In 2019, Forejtek reached three junior grand slam finals, one in singles and two in doubles, winning them all. At the 2019 Australian Forejtek and compatriot partner Dalibor Svrčina won the boys' doubles title beating Americans Emilio Nava and Cannon Kingsley 7–6(7–5), 6–4 in the finals. At the 2019 Wimbledon Championships he partnered with another compatriot Jiří Lehečka capturing his second boys' grand slam doubles title, defeating Govind Nanda and Liam Draxl 7–5, 6–4 in the championship match. At the 2019 US Open, he defeated Emilio Nava 6–7(4–7), 6–0, 6–2 in the final to win the boys’ singles championship.

Forejtek was the World No. 1 male junior player according to the ITF combined singles and doubles junior rankings, achieving this feat on 9 September 2019.

Professional career

2019
As wildcard entrants, Forejtek and fellow Czech Michael Vrbenský won the doubles title at the 2019 Svijany Open challenger tournament in Liberec, Czech Republic. Impressively, they defeated the number 3 seeds in the quarterfinals (second round), the number 1 seeds in the semifinals and then claimed the title by bettering the number 2 seeds Nikola Ćaćić and Antonio Šančić 6–4, 6–3 in the final.

2020–2021: ATP and top 300 debut
Forejtek made his ATP debut at 2020 Sofia Open receiving a wildcard entry into the singles main draw. He proceeded to claim an upset victory over former World No. 3 Marin Čilić in the first round, losing just 5 games. He was then defeated by another former top 10 player Richard Gasquet in the second round.

Forejtek made his debut in the top 300 on 1 November 2021 at World No. 294.

2022: Top 250 debut
He made his top 250 debut on 16 May 2022 at No. 226 following a semifinal showing as a qualifier at the 2022 Heilbronner Neckarcup Challenger in Germany.

Junior Grand Slam finals

Singles: 1 (1 title)

Doubles: 2 (2 titles)

ATP Challenger and ITF Futures finals

Singles: 5 (2–3)

Doubles: 7 (5–2)

Performance timeline

Singles
Current through the 2020 Sofia Open

References

External links 
 
 
 

2001 births
Living people
Czech male tennis players
Australian Open (tennis) junior champions
US Open (tennis) junior champions
Sportspeople from Plzeň
Grand Slam (tennis) champions in boys' singles
Grand Slam (tennis) champions in boys' doubles
Wimbledon junior champions